Dandie Fashions or sometimes Dandy Fashions was a London fashion boutique founded in 1966, following a chance encounter at the Speakeasy Club between Freddie Hornik and Alan Holston, who then got together with Australian John Crittle, the Guinness heir Tara Browne and Neil Winterbotham, and launched the new business.

Dandie Fashions opened its shop at 161 King's Road, Chelsea in October 1966. John Crittle had previously worked for Michael Rainey in his boutique Hung On You. Crittle and Tara Browne wanted a retail outlet for their new tailoring company Foster and Tara. In December 1966, Browne died in a car crash, while he was on his way to discuss shop front designs with the graphic artist David Vaughan. Crittle bought his share of the business. In this boutique Amanda Lear was arrested in 1967 by the police with drugs belonging to The Rolling Stones.

Five months after opening their Apple Boutique in Baker Street (which ran from 7 December 1967 to 30 July 1968), the Beatles invested in Dandie, renaming it Apple Tailoring (Civil & Theatric). They were attracted to King's Road by the presence of the clothing boutiques Dandie, along with Granny Takes a Trip and Hung On You. Apple Tailoring opened at the same 161 King's Road premises as Dandie, on 23 May 1968. Neil Aspinall and Apple's accountant Stephen Maltz became directors. John Lennon and George Harrison attended the launch party. However, it never made a profit and closed some months later.

References

Clothing retailers of England
Clothing companies of England
Clothing companies based in London
Shops in London
1960s fashion
Defunct retail companies of the United Kingdom
King's Road, Chelsea, London